Griffel is a surname. Notable people with the surname include:

Anett Griffel (born 1990), Estonian model
Kay Griffel (born 1940), American opera singer

See also
Griffey